Local education and training boards (LETBs) are the thirteen regional structures in the health education and training system of the NHS in England, established as part of the NHS reforms of April 2013. They are statutory committees of Health Education England

Role
LETBs have three main functions:

 to identify and agree the local needs for education and training - to deliver the right people and skills to meet future service needs
 to plan and commission high quality education and training in its region in order to secure future workforce supply and improve patient outcomes
 support national workforce priorities set by Health Education England

Certain LETBs may take responsibility for the national coordination of education and training of some of the smaller professions, for example HEE West Midlands is the lead commissioner for Healthcare science.

Regions
The 13 LETB regions in the NHS are:
 East Midlands
 East of England
 Yorkshire and the Humber
 Wessex
 Thames Valley
 North West London
 South London
 North Central and East London
 Kent, Surrey and Sussex
 North East
 North West
 West Midlands
 South West

References

External links
 HEE website
 Our Strategic Intent - document setting out purpose of HEE and LETBs

Career development in the United Kingdom
Education in England
2012 establishments in England
Government agencies established in 2012
Health education organizations
Higher education organisations based in the United Kingdom
Medical education in the United Kingdom
National Health Service (England)
Nursing education in the United Kingdom
Public health education